Bartus is a surname. Notable people with the surname include:

 Barbara Bartuś (born 1967), Polish politician
 Theodor Bartus (1858–1941), German sailor

Surnames of European origin